Spirastrellidae is a family of sponges belonging to the order Clionaida.

Genera:
 Diplastrella Topsent, 1918
 Spirastrella Schmidt, 1868

References

Sponge families